Elections to Epping Forest Council were held on 3 May 2007.  One third of the council was up for election and the Conservative party regained overall control of the council, thanks initially to a by-election in Grange Hill in December 2006, and then following gains at this election.

The British National Party retained all its representation on the council with 6 seats, and marginally increased its vote share. The remaining Labour councillor, Peter Gode of Shelley retained his seat, albeit with a significantly reduced majority. The Conservatives, following gains from the Liberal Democrats regained control of the council having last had control in 1994. One Independent lost their seat to the Conservatives, leaving two remaining on the council.

This election saw the Epping Community Action Group come third in both Epping wards. The party, registered in 2005, ran on a pledge to rejuvenate Epping high street and save small shops by relaxing parking laws. It opposed fortnightly collection of household rubbish and committed to not build on green belt land. Run by Ian Anderson, a former leader of the National Front between 1990 and 1995. Anderson's local party also committed to re-open the local adult learning centre and to stop the town centre becoming an "endless parade of chain coffeehouses and takeaways". Neither Epping candidates, including Anderson won seats, causing the party to dissolve.

Due to no Loughton seats being contested in this cycle, no Loughton Residents Association councillors were up for election, and hence did not change in number.

By-elections

Grange Hill by-election
This by-election win by the Conservatives gave the party council control for the first time since 1994.

Results

Broadley Common, Epping Upland & Nazeing

Buckhurst Hill West

Chipping Ongar, Greensted and Marden Ash

Epping Hemnall

Epping Lindsey and Thornwood Common

Grange Hill

Lambourne

Lower Nazeing

Lower Sheering

North Weald Bassett

Roydon

Shelley

Waltham Abbey High Beach

Waltham Abbey Honey Lane

Waltham Abbey North East

Waltham Abbey Paternoster

Waltham Abbey South West

References

2007 Epping Forest election result
Ward results

2007
2007 English local elections
2000s in Essex